The Upper Ridge Site is an archeological site on Mockhorn Island, a barrier island off the coast of the Eastern Shore of Virginia in Northampton County.  The site documents over 10,000 years of human occupation from Paleo-Indian through Middle Woodland periods (9500 B.C. to A.D. 900).

The site was listed on the National Register of Historic Places in 2005.

See also
National Register of Historic Places listings in Northampton County, Virginia

References

Archaeological sites on the National Register of Historic Places in Virginia
Northampton County, Virginia
National Register of Historic Places in Northampton County, Virginia